Utkarsh (Hindi: उत्कर्ष) is a given name of Hindi and Indian origin primarily for males and meaning prosperity, awakening, and flourishing.

People named Utkarsh 
 Utkarsh Ambudkar, American actor
 Utkarsh Bhaskar, Indian cricketer
 Utkarsh Chandra, Indian cricketer
 Utkarsh Sharma, Indian actor
 Utkarsh Singh, Indian cricketer
 Utkarsh Verma, Indian politician

References 

Indian masculine given names